The Museo Experimental El Eco is a contemporary art gallery in the centre of Mexico City, Mexico. It was designed by sculptor Mathias Goeritz, a Mexican artist of German origin who worked closely with the Mexican architect Luis Barragán. Originally built in 1952–53, the gallery was extended by FR-EE/Fernando Romero Enterprise in 2007 "to expand its offices and special services to improve daily operations".

History of the building 

In 1952, businessman Daniel Mont commissioned artist Mathias Goeritz to build a place that would articulate a new relationship between his commercial interests of a restaurant-bar and the avant-garde spirit of some cultural actors of the time, with the intention of finding something different from what was established. Under the premise "do whatever you want", Goeritz conceived the space on Sullivan Street in Mexico City. It was designed as a poetic structure whose layout of corridors, ceilings, walls, rooms and openings led its visitors to reflect their experience of space in an emotional act; This concept challenged the dominant interests of functionalism in architecture at that time. Based on his "Manifesto of emotional architecture", his writings also refer to inspiration of religious experiences and Gothic and Baroque architecture.

Goeritz conceived the building as a penetrable sculpture. This space was the creation of an unprecedented platform for the arts in the context of Mexican and international art of the 1950s.

In 2004, the Universidad Nacional Autónoma de México bought the building which re-opened its doors on 7 September 2005 after many months of restoration work to bring the building back to its original state. The project was intended to revive Goeritz's architectural legacy.

Pabellón Eco 

In 2008, the museum initiated a national architecture competition to continue the legacy of spatial experimentation that hosts an interdisciplinary art program. The project offers a platform for young Mexican architects and is co-produced with Buró—Buró, an independent non-profit cultural office. The museum also organizes a conference around experimental architecture called Pabellón Eco: Panorama.

Pavilion winners:
 2010: Frida Escobedo
 2011: Estudio MMX
 2012: Luis Aldrete
 2013: Estudio Macías-Peredo
 2015: Taller Capital
 2016: APRDELESP 
 2018: Taller TO
 2020: Cronoboros

Publications 

 Ensayo de Miguel A. González Virgen, 2006
 Estamos hartos (otra vez), Mauricio Marcin and Ida Rodríguez, 2014
 Autodestrucción 2, Abraham Cruzvillegas, 2014
 La Chinche (2014-2015), Mauricio Marcin (Ed.), 2015
 Jugador como pelota, pelota como cancha, Felipe Mujica, 2015
 La disonancia de El Eco, David Miranda, 2015 (reedición 2017)
 La perla de la ostra, Abraham Cruzvillegas, Gabriel Escalante and Carlos Reygadas, 2019
 La conquista del Pedregal, Julio García Murillo and David Miranda, 2019
 Abstracción Temporal. Museo Experimental el Eco (2010), Tobias Ostrander (Ed.), 2011
 Arquitectura Emocional. Museo Experimental el Eco (2011), Macarena Hernández (Ed.), 2012
 Re vista #1 (2012), Macarena Hernández (Ed.), 2013
 Re vista #2 (2013), Macarena Hernández and Luis Felipe Ortega (Eds.), 2014
 Re vista #3 (2014), Macarena Hernández (Ed.), 2016
 Re vista #4 (2015 y 2016), Macarena Hernández (Ed.), 2018

References

External links

Buró—Buró organization website, partner for Pabellón Eco

Contemporary art galleries in Mexico